Methylhistidine may refer to:

 1-Methylhistidine 
 3-Methylhistidine
 N-Methylhistidine 
 α-Methylhistidine

See also
 Histidine methyl ester